Thomas Kruse (born 7 September 1959) is a German former professional footballer who played as a defender for Schalke 04. He completed 199 matches in the Bundesliga and made 63 appearances in the 2. Bundesliga for the club.

References

External links 
 
 

1959 births
Living people
People from Recklinghausen
Sportspeople from Münster (region)
German footballers
Germany under-21 international footballers
Germany B international footballers
Association football defenders
Bundesliga players
2. Bundesliga players
FC Schalke 04 players
DSC Wanne-Eickel players
Footballers from North Rhine-Westphalia